This is a list of curling clubs in the Canadian province of New Brunswick. Curling in New Brunswick is organized by the New Brunswick Curling Association. The NBCA divides the province into six regions:

Northeast
Bathurst Curling Club - Bathurst
Campbellton Curling Club - Campbellton
Club de curling Tracadie/Sheila - Sheila
Miramichi Curling Club - Miramichi
Sportek Curling Inc. - Beresford

Southeast
Curl Moncton - Moncton
Fundy Curling Club - Riverside-Albert
Rexton Curling Club - Rexton
Sackville Curling Club - Sackville

Southwest
Grand Manan Curling Club - Grand Manan
Harvey Curling Club - Harvey Station
Heather Curling Club - St. Andrews
St. Stephen Curling Club - St. Stephen

Central
Capital Winter Club - Fredericton
Doaktown Curling Club - Doaktown
Gage Golf and Curling Association - Oromocto
Gladstone Curling Club - Fredericton Junction
Nashwaak Curling Club - Stanley

South
Carleton Curling Club - Saint John
Hampton Curling Club - Hampton
Riverside Golf & Curling Club - Rothesay
Sussex Golf & Curling Club - Sussex
Thistle St. Andrews Curling Club - Saint John

Northwest
Florenceville Curling Club - Florenceville
Grand Falls Sporting Club Inc. - Grand Falls
Nackawic Curling Club - Nackawic
Woodstock Golf & Curling Club - Woodstock

 New Brunswick
Curling clubs
Sports venues in New Brunswick
 
Curling in New Brunswick
New Brunswick